Seven cities submitted bids for 2016 Summer Olympics and Paralympics on September 13, 2007, aiming to host the Games of the XXXI Olympiad. All of them were recognized by the International Olympic Committee (IOC) on September 14, 2007, becoming Applicant cities. Although several cities submitted to be in consideration to host the 2016 Olympics, including New York City and Los Angeles, on June 4, 2008, the IOC Executive Board shortlisted the four strongest bids to become Candidate cities. Those cities were Chicago, Madrid, Rio de Janeiro and Tokyo; the decisions were made during a meeting in Athens, Greece. The remaining Applicant cities—Baku, Doha and Prague—were eliminated.

The four Candidate cities were selected according to a detailed study of the Applicant Files received by the IOC Working Group on January 14, 2008. The four cities submitted the Candidature Files to the IOC on February 11, 2009. They were analyzed by the IOC Evaluation Commission, which made site inspections in Chicago (April 4–7, 2009), Tokyo (April 16–19, 2009), Rio de Janeiro (April 27–May 2, 2009) and Madrid (May 5–8, 2009). Under the leadership of Nawal El Moutawakel, the Evaluation Commission released its report on September 2, 2009; one month prior to the election.

With the presence of the heads of state from all four Candidate cities, the 121st IOC Session took place in Copenhagen, Denmark, on October 2, 2009. Chicago began the presentations at Bella Center; followed by Tokyo, Rio de Janeiro and Madrid; which were attended by several celebrities such as the King of Spain, Oprah Winfrey and Pelé. Before the vote, the IOC Evaluation Commission presented its report to the Session. Chicago fell in the first round, followed by Tokyo, after the eligible IOC members have been asked to vote, in a three-round exhaustive ballot process.

Rio de Janeiro defeated Madrid in the final round by 66 votes over 32, winning the rights to host the 2016 Summer Olympics and Paralympics. Brazil would become the first lusophone country and Rio de Janeiro the first city in South America to host the Summer Olympics. The announcement was made by Jacques Rogge, president of the IOC, in a widely broadcast ceremony. The lengthy and intensive bidding process, considered to be one of the tightest in history, was marked by several controversies such as espionage, racism and opposition movements.

Out of the six cities that failed to be awarded the 2016 Olympics, four of them bid for the 2020 Summer Olympics. Baku, Doha, Madrid and Tokyo were official Applicant Cities, with Madrid and Tokyo advancing to become Candidate Cities and with Tokyo eventually being selected.

Bidding process
The Olympic bidding process begins with the submission of a city's application to the International Olympic Committee (IOC) by its National Olympic Committee (NOC) and ends with the election of the host city by the members of the IOC during an ordinary session. The process is governed by the Olympic Charter, as stated in Chapter 5, Rule 34.

Since 1999, the process has consisted of two phases. During the first phase, which begins immediately after the bid submission deadline, the "applicant cities" are required to answer a questionnaire covering themes of importance to a successful Games organization. This information allows the IOC to analyze the cities' hosting capacities and the strengths and weaknesses of their plans. Following a detailed study of the submitted questionnaires and ensuing reports, the IOC Executive Board selects the cities that are qualified to proceed to the next phase. The second phase is the true candidature stage: the accepted applicant cities (from now on referred to as "candidate cities") are required to submit a second questionnaire in the form of an extended, more detailed, candidature file. These files are carefully studied by the IOC Evaluation Commission, a group composed of IOC members, representatives of international sport federations, NOCs, athletes, the International Paralympic Committee, and international experts in various fields. The members of the Evaluation Commission then make four-day inspection visits to each of the candidate cities, where they check the proposed venues and are briefed about details of the themes covered in the candidature file. The Evaluation Commission communicates the results of its inspections in a report sent to the IOC members up to one month before the electing IOC Session.

The IOC Session in which a host city is elected takes place in a country that did not submit an application to stage the Olympics. The election is made by the assembled active IOC members (excluding honorary and honor members), each possessing one vote. Members from countries that have a city taking part in the election cannot vote while the city is in the running. The voting is conducted in a succession of rounds until one bid achieves an absolute majority of votes; if this does not happen in the first round, the bid with the fewest votes is eliminated and another voting round begins. In the case of a tie for the lowest number of votes, a special runoff vote is carried out, with the winner proceeding to the next round. After each round, the eliminated bid is announced. Following the announcement of the host city, the successful bid delegation signs the "Host City Contract" with the IOC, which delegates the responsibilities of the Games organisation to the city and respective NOC.

Evaluation

Application phase

The deadline to submit applications for the 2016 Summer Olympics was September 13, 2007. The seven cities that submitted bids before that date also met the January 14, 2008 deadline for submission of the first phase questionnaire. Through analysis of the questionnaires, the IOC gave a weighted-average score to each city based on the scores obtained in each of the questionnaire's eleven themes: political and social support, general infrastructure, sports venues, Olympic Village, environment, accommodation, transport, security, past experience, finance, and legacy. If a bid's score was higher than six (IOC's predefined benchmark score), the city was considered highly capable of hosting the Games; otherwise, its chances were very slim. On June 4, 2008, the IOC announced the cities accepted as candidates: Four of the five highest-rated applicants progressed to the next phase as official candidate cities. As stipulated, the IOC granted them the right to use the Olympic rings on their candidature emblem, together with a label identifying each as a Candidate City. The International Olympic Committee went against precedent when it selected Rio de Janeiro over Doha—a city which scored higher yet was eliminated from the field. Doha's weaknesses of a small population, lack of facilities, and Games dates outside of the IOC's desired window may have been too large an obstacle for the IOC to accept. Typically, the IOC selects all the top scoring bids which reach the established minimum benchmark.

The Working Group divided the Evaluation Report on eleven detailed themes and weightings: Government support, legal issues and public opinion (2); General infrastructure (5); Sports venues (4); Olympic Village(s) (3); Environmental conditions and impact (2); Accommodation (5); Transport concept (3); Safety and security (3); Experience from past sports events (2); Finance (3); and, Overall project and legacy (3). Weightings, varying between 1 and 5 (5 being the highest), were attributed by the Working Group to each criterion, reflecting the level of information requested of the Applicant Cities at this stage of the bid process, and the potential of achieving the level required for the organisation of the Olympic Games in the seven years' preparation time. The Working Group set the benchmark at 6 as minimum required grade (on a scale of 0 to 10). This grade was attributed by the Working Group to the main and sub-criteria for each Applicant City, reflecting the assessment of the Working Group (quality, number, location, concept, etc.).

Candidature phase
Nawal El Moutawakel of Morocco headed the Evaluation Commission. She also chaired the evaluation commission for the 2012 Summer Olympics bids. Other members include Olympic Games Executive Director Gilbert Felli, IOC Member Ching-Kuo Wu from Chinese Taipei, IOC Member Craig Reedie from Great Britain, IOC Member Guy Drut from France, IOC Member Mounir Sabet from Egypt, IOC Member and Athletes' Commission Representative Alexander Popov from Russia, IOC Member and ASOIF Representative Els van Breda Vriesman from The Netherlands and IPC Representative Gregory Hartung from Australia.

The Commission made on-site inspections in the second quarter of 2009. visiting Chicago April 2 to 8, Tokyo April 14 to 20, Rio de Janeiro April 27 to May 3, and Madrid May 4 to 9. In a change from previous years, the commission's visits were extended from four days to seven. They issued a comprehensive technical appraisal for IOC members one month before the elections in October 2009.

Election
At the 121st IOC Session in Copenhagen, Denmark on October 2, 2009, final voting took place. The three ballots were held within a 15 minutes period, and although the first two ballots results were announced immediately, the third ballot result was announced only about one hour later. The final result and winner was announced as Rio de Janeiro at 16:49 UTC (6:49 pm in Copenhagen and 1:49 pm in Rio de Janeiro). The results were as shown:

2016 host city election ballots results

Bidding cities

Candidate cities

Applicant cities

Potential cities overview

  Several Australian cities expressed interest, such as Brisbane.
  Bangkok, Thailand expressed much enthusiasm after their strong performance in the 2004 Games, but instead applied to host the 2010 Youth Games.
  Brussels, Belgium showed interest after some politicians considered an organisation between a Belgian city and a Dutch City after the Euro 2000 co-organized by both countries.
  Buenos Aires, Argentina participated in the 2004 Summer Olympics bid
  Cape Town and Durban, South Africa expressed interest.
  Delhi, India was originally set to enter a bid; however, in April 2007 it announced it would bid for the 2020 games instead.
  Dubai, United Arab Emirates was also posed to make a serious bid, but in the end did not for unknown reasons.
  Fukuoka and Sapporo were other internal candidates eliminated by the JOC.
  Houston and Philadelphia were eliminated by the USOC, San Francisco withdrew when it lost stadium funding and Chicago was chosen over Los Angeles for the bid competition.
  Istanbul, Turkey broke with its standing policy to bid for every game, but vowed to try again.
  Lisbon, Portugal considered bidding.
  Monterrey The Mexican Olympic committee declined to place a bid.
  Montreal and Toronto expressed interest, but Canada abandoned any plans for a bid after Vancouver won the 2010 Winter Olympics.
  Nairobi, Kenya The sports minister expressed interest in a bid, but the Kenyan Olympics head said it was not the right time.
  Rome, Italy was a leading candidate for a time, but they pulled out, preferring to wait for 2020.
  São Paulo was considered, but the Brazilian Olympic Committee opted for Rio de Janeiro.
  /  San Diego and Tijuana discussed a joint bid for what would have been the first binational Olympics.

Predicting indices
Two websites, GamesBids.com and Around the Rings, feature predicting indices which specialize in evaluations of Olympiad bids. They periodically release analysis of the candidates and assigns them a score between 0 and 100, or 0 and 110 respectively. The score produces a number that can be used to rate a bid relative to past successful bids - and possibly gauge its potential future success. GamesBids.com's scale is called BidIndex, AtR's is called the Power Index.

Both indices correctly predicted the winner, Rio de Janeiro, but failed to predict the poor showing of Chicago, which was the first to be eliminated from the final 4, as well as the strong showing of Madrid, who was the last contender against Rio.

Notes

Released on September 10, 2009. Doha, Prague, and Baku are no longer being rated. Their scores are from May 28, 2008.

as of September 27, 2009

References

External links

 
 
 
 
 
 
 
 
 
 
 
 
 
 
 

 
Summer Olympics bids
bids
October 2009 events in Europe
2009 in Copenhagen
Events in Copenhagen